Paolo Mastrantonio (born July 17, 1967 in Rome) is a retired Italian professional football player. 

His first ever professional game also turned out to be his last in the Serie A as he played in the lower leagues for the rest of his career.

Mastrantonio made 15 appearances in Serie B with U.S. Casertana 1908 from 1991 to 1992.

References

1967 births
Living people
Italian footballers
Serie A players
Serie B players
A.S. Roma players
Genoa C.F.C. players
U.S. Avellino 1912 players
Montevarchi Calcio Aquila 1902 players
Venezia F.C. players
L.R. Vicenza players

Association football defenders